Professor Syed Fazle Imam Rizvi commonly known as Fazle Imam (7 August 1940 – 31 August 2020) was an Indian Urdu scholar, poet, writer and teacher at University. He is known for his literature expertise in various languages Urdu, Hindi, Sanskrit, Arabic, Persian, Bhojpuri, Rajasthani. He has written books, ghazals, and nazms, articles in Urdu, Hindi, Bhojpuri, Rajasthani.

Family background, early life, and education

Fazle Imam Rizvi was born on 7 August 1940 in a village in Azamgarh district, which is now in Uttar Pradesh. He belonged to a family of landlords. His father, Late Mr. Syed Mushtaq Husain, was a freedom fighter, and his mother, Khursheedun Nisa, took care of him. He was the only son in the family. After completing his secondary education at Shahganj Public School in Shahganj of the Jaunpur district, he moved out for higher education. His father wanted him to get into engineering and join a government job but Fazle Imam had a greater interest in the field of Literature and wanted to shape his career in the same field. He did his Ph.D. (Doctorate) from Gorakhpur University and is also a First-Person who did (D, Litt) from the same university. After completing his research under the supervision of Professor Mehmood Elahi Mehmmod, Elahi became head of the department and later became the vice-chancellor of the university. Fazle Imam later became a lecturer and an assistant professor at various degree colleges and universities.

Career and contributions in literature

His contributions in the field of Literature and Arts are incredible. He has written more than 75 books in various languages like Urdu, Hindi, Bhojpuri and Rajasthani. In 1972, he joined the Department of Urdu and became Head of both Urdu and Persian at the University of Rajasthan, Jaipur till 1986. Later, he joined the University of Allahabad and became the Urdu Department, Chief proctor, warden, librarian and was also appointed as the chairman of Uttar Pradesh Secondary Education Service Commission. He retired from the same university in 2006.

Major works
 Has written and edited  More than 75 Books 
 Editor of many magazines
 More than 40 research scholars did their Ph.D. under his supervision  
 More than 55 years of teaching experience 
 Around 800 articles, papers on criticism and research management 
 Review articles on social and current  issues 
 Thesis on Amirullah Tasleem "Hayat aur Shairi"
 Bhojpuri Adab Ka Taaruf
 Masanvi Khaanjre-Ishque- tasleem
 Anees Shinasi
 Jadeed Hindi Shairi -SAMT-O- RAFTAR
  The first book on poet Josh Malihabadi Shaire- akhruzzaman 
 Tanqeedicriticism meyar
 Jadeed Urdu Tanqeed aur Ehtishyam Husain
 Intekhabe Kalame  Josh Haryana Urdu Akademi

Awards and honors
 Anees Award Urdu Academy, Uttar Pradesh
 Nawae Meer by All India Meer Academy
 Bhojpuri Bhaskar by Akhil Bhartiya Bhojpuri Parishad
 Sahitya Vibhushan by Bhasha Sangam Bhopal
 Bihar Urdu Academy
 West Bengal Urdu Academy
 Awarded Vidhya Vachaspati Hindi Sahitya Sammelan Allahabad

External links
E-BOOK OF SYED FAZL-E-IMAM RIZVI
Kaynat-e-Najm released
Academic Services of Amir Meenai lecture 
Ali Day 2020 lecture  Avadhnama
Bazm-e-Nahjul Falah Muftiganj lecture on Guzarta Waqt Aur Hamari Zindagi
Mushaira & Kavi Sammelan 2019 
Kaifi Ki Hayat Aur Karname seminar 2019, All India Kaifi Azmi Academy, Lucknow
Seminar Governor Book 'Chairiveti Chairiveti' 2016  at Lucknow University
Felicitation Ceremony Prof Fazle Imam
‘Shaam-e Adab’, a seminar on Mir Anees
 Islamic lecture at Baitus-Salat, Kareli, Allahabad on 12 Feb 2009
Islamic lecture at Jashn-e-Saheb-e-Asre Wazzaman
Kulliyat-e-Mekash Akbarabadi
Inna Lillahi wa inna ilayhi raji'un
Inna Lillahi wa inna ilayhi raji'un

References

1940 births
2020 deaths
Urdu critics
People from Allahabad
Deen Dayal Upadhyay Gorakhpur University alumni
Academic staff of the University of Allahabad
Academic staff of the University of Rajasthan
Urdu-language writers from India